Nogometni Klub Rudeš, commonly referred to as NK Rudeš or simply Rudeš, is a Croatian football club founded in 1957 in Zagreb's neighbourhood of Rudeš. The club competes in Croatia's second division.

History
Being a lower league club through most of its history, Rudeš achieved promotion to the Croatian Second Football League in 2009, where it quickly established itself as one of the most stable clubs and a regular top table finisher. In the 2016–17 season, Rudeš clinched the title, earning promotion to the Croatian First Football League for the 2017–18 season.

In May 2017, Rudeš signed a ten-year partnership deal with Spanish club Deportivo Alavés, with Rudeš acting as a feeder club. However, the agreement was terminated after the first year.

Recent seasons

First-team squad

References

External links
 

 
Association football clubs established in 1957
Football clubs in Croatia
Football clubs in Zagreb
1957 establishments in Croatia
Deportivo Alavés